The 1929 Montana Grizzlies football team represented the University of Montana in the 1929 college football season as a member of the Pacific Coast Conference (PCC). The Grizzlies were led by fourth-year head coach Frank W. Milburn, played their home games at Dornblaser Field and finished the season with a record of three wins, five losses and one tie (3–5–1, 0–4–1 PCC).

Schedule

References

Montana
Montana Grizzlies football seasons
Montana Grizzlies football